2 Ceti is a single star in the equatorial constellation of Cetus, near the border with Aquarius. It is visible to the naked eye with an apparent visual magnitude of 4.483. It appears to be moving further from the Earth with a heliocentric radial velocity of about +8 km/s.

The stellar classification for this star is B9 IVn, matching a B-type subgiant star with "nebulous" absorption lines due to rapid rotation. Estimates of the rotation rate range from 116 to 237 km/s, and this high rate of spin is giving the star an equatorial bulge that is 12% larger than the polar radius. 2 Ceti is about 217 million years old with 2.7 times the mass of the Sun and 2.75 times the Sun's radius. It is radiating 119 times the Sun's luminosity from its photosphere at an effective temperature of 11,419 K. An infrared excess has been detected around this star by the Akari satellite at a wavelength of 18μm, suggesting there is an orbiting debris disk.

References

B-type subgiants
Circumstellar disks
Cetus (constellation)
Durchmusterung objects
Ceti, 02
225132
000301
9098